Oxford Montessori Schools is a group of progressive, co-educational private schools based in and around Oxford, England. Founded in 1990, the Oxford Montessori Schools group is the largest Montessori organisation in Oxfordshire.
The group consists of three schools:
 Forest Farm School - a combined nursery, primary and senior school (ages 2 to 16) in Elsfield, Oxfordshire. 
 Wolvercote Montessori Nursery
 St Giles', Oxford St Giles Montessori Nursery

The schools emphasise a progressive educational philosophy, inspired by the principles of Montessori education. The most recent Ofsted report rates Forest Farm School as 'good', noting that "pupils enjoy the warm, family atmosphere created by the school" and "achieve well over time owing to good teaching and a broad and balanced curriculum."

Oxford Montessori Schools is a small school with around 80 pupils at the Forest Farm campus, and is a member of the Human Scale Education movement.

References

External links
 Oxford Montessori Schools website
 Ofsted Report 2013

1990 establishments in England
Private schools in Oxfordshire
Montessori schools in the United Kingdom
Educational institutions established in 1990